is an anime television series produced by Aniplex and A-1 Pictures. It aired from October to December 2020. Two light novel series, titled Warlords of Sigrdrifa Rusalka and Senyoku no Sigrdrifa Sakura, were published by Kadokawa Shoten under their Kadokawa Sneaker Bunko imprint. Additionally, two manga series, titled Senyoku no Sigrdrifa Non-Scramble and Senyoku no Sigrdrifa Kurū no Eiyū, are serialized by Kadokawa Shoten.

Premise
When humanity is threatened by mysterious Pillars, the Norse god Odin offers humanity a way to fight back: young female pilots called "Valkyries", each piloting a special, magically-enhanced plane capable of fighting this mysterious new foe. One of these Valkyries is Claudia Bruford, a German pilot who gets transferred to Tateyama Air Base, where she befriends a trio of Japanese Valkyries, and learns the value of friendship.

Characters

 Nicknamed , she is a socially-withdrawn German pilot and one of the world's most experienced Valkyries with the title "Valkyrie Schwertleite". Although she is praised as the "Valkyrie of Salvation", she silently refers to herself as the "Grim Reaper" because she survives battles that kill all of her teammates. Upon being transferred to Japan, she is surprised that the Japanese military is less formal to what she is normally used but nevertheless endeavors to befriend her new teammates. She flies a Gloster Gladiator. 

 An energetic and friendly Valkyrie stationed at Tateyama Base. Miyako maintains a positive outlook on life and works to ensure everybody is smiling. She brings her katana with her on missions. She flies a Nakajima Ki-44.

 A socially awkward and slightly arrogant Valkyrie stationed at Tateyama Base. Azuzu is a genius inventor and master tactician, often modifying her plane with special equipment and coming up with clever plans to combat Pillars. She was the de facto leader of the 909th Squadron until Claudia was transferred in. She flies a Heinkel He 100.

 A kind hearted Valkyrie stationed at Tateyama Base. Sonoka is often polite and reserved, but when in the cockpit, she becomes the most reckless pilot in the squadron. She flies a Macchi M.C.72.

 A European S-class Valkyrie who previously flew with Claudia. 

 A European S-class Valkyrie who previously flew with Claudia. 

A member of Shield Squadron who assists the 909th against the Pillars. He is identified by his mullet and red bandanna. He flies a Mitsubishi F-15J.

A member of Shield Squadron who assists the 909th against the Pillars. He is identified by his blond buzz cut. He flies a Mitsubishi F-15J.

A member of Shield Squadron who assists the 909th against the Pillars. He is identified by his bald head and sunglasses. He flies a Mitsubishi F-15J.

King of the Norse gods. He offers humanity the opportunity to defend itself from the Pillars through the power of the Valkyries. He can change his physical appearance, often choosing to look like an old man or a young boy, and holds some interest in Claudia.

 A veteran Valkyrie who travels all over Japan to respond to hotspots. Amatsuka is already close friends with Miyako, Azuzu, and Sonoka, though her relationship with Sonoka has become strained due to an event in their past. She flies a Grumman F7F Tigercat.

Media

Light novels
A light novel spin-off prequel series to the anime, titled , was published by Kadokawa Shoten under their Kadokawa Sneaker Bunko imprint. It is written by series writer Tappei Nagatsuki and illustrated by Takuya Fujima. The light novel is licensed in North America by Yen Press.

Another light novel spin-off prequel titled , also written by Nagatsuki, was published by Kadokawa Shoten under their Kadokawa Sneaker Bunko imprint.

Volume list

Warlords of Sigrdrifa Rusalka

Senyoku no Sigrdrifa Sakura

Manga
A manga spin-off series by Kanari Abe, titled , began serialization in Kadokawa Shoten's Monthly Comic Alive magazine on July 27, 2020. 

A second series by Takeshi Nogami, titled , began serialization on Kadokawa Shoten's Comic Hu website on October 4, 2020.

Volume list

Senyoku no Sigrdrifa Non-Scramble

Senyoku no Sigrdrifa Kurū no Eiyū

Anime
The anime television series was written by Tappei Nagatsuki and directed by Hirotaka Tokuda, featuring character designs from Takuya Fujima. Shigeo Komori and Hajime Hyakkoku composed the series' music, while Takaaki Suzuki served as the co-writer and provided world-building and research for the series. The series was originally set to premiere in July 2020. However, it aired from October 3 to December 26, 2020 due to the COVID-19 pandemic. 

Nanawo Akari performed the opening theme song "Higher's High," while Spira Spica performed the ending theme song . The series began with a 1-hour special and ran for 12 episodes.

The series was licensed by Funimation via Aniplex. On November 6, 2020, Funimation announced that the series would receive an English dub, which premiered the following day. Following Sony's acquisition of Crunchyroll, the series was moved to Crunchyroll.

Notes

References

External links
  
 

2020 Japanese novels
A-1 Pictures
Anime postponed due to the COVID-19 pandemic
Anime with original screenplays
Aniplex
Crunchyroll anime
Fantasy anime and manga
Kadokawa Shoten manga
Kadokawa Sneaker Bunko
Light novels
Media Factory manga
Norse mythology in anime and manga
Seinen manga
Tokyo MX original programming
Yen Press titles